The Good Roads Movement occurred in the United States between the late 1870s and the 1920s. It was the rural dimension of the Progressive movement. A key player was the United States Post Office Department. Once a commitment was made for Rural Free Delivery of the mail, the Post Office had to determine which local roads were suitable and which were not. Farmers living on officially unusable roads now had motivation to get them upgraded. Advocates for improved roads turned local agitation into a national political movement. It started as a coalition between farmers' organizations groups and bicyclists' organizations, such as the League of American Wheelmen. The goal was state and federal spending to improve rural roads. By 1910, automobile lobbies such as the American Automobile Association joined the campaign, coordinated by the National Good Roads Association.

Outside cities, roads were dirt or gravel; mud in the winter and dust in the summer.  Travel was slow and expensive. Early organizers cited Europe where road construction and maintenance was supported by national and local governments. In its early years, the main goal of the movement was education for road building in rural areas between cities and to help rural populations gain the social and economic benefits enjoyed by cities where citizens benefited from railroads, trolleys and paved streets. Even more than traditional vehicles, the newly invented bicycles could benefit from good country roads.

History

The Good Roads Movement was officially founded in May 1880, when bicycle enthusiasts, riding clubs and manufacturers met in Newport, Rhode Island, to form the League of American Wheelmen to support the burgeoning use of bicycles and to protect their interests from legislative discrimination. The League quickly went national and in 1892 began publishing Good Roads magazine. In three years circulation reached one million. Early movement advocates enlisted the help of journalists, farmers, politicians and engineers in the project of improving the nation's roadways, but the movement took off when it was adopted by bicyclists.

Groups across the country held road conventions and public demonstrations, published material on the benefits of good roads and endeavoured to influence legislators on local, state and national levels. Support for candidates often became crucial factors in elections. Not only advocating road improvements for bicyclists, the League pressed the idea to farmers and rural communities, publishing literature such as the famous pamphlet, The Gospel of Good Roads.

New Jersey became the first state to pass a law providing for a state to participate in road-building projects. In 1893, the U.S. Department of Agriculture initiated a systematic evaluation of existing highway systems. In that same year, Charles Duryea produced the first American gasoline-powered vehicle, and Rural Free Delivery began.  By June 1894, "Many of the railway companies [had] made concessions in transporting road materials ranging from half rates to free carriage."

20th century

At the turn of the twentieth century, interest in the bicycle began to wane in the face of increasing interest in automobiles. Subsequently, other groups took the lead in the road lobby. As the automobile was developed and gained momentum, organizations developed such cross-county projects as the coast-to-coast east–west Lincoln Highway in 1913, headed by auto parts and auto racing magnate Carl G. Fisher, and later his north–south Dixie Highway in 1915, which extended from Canada to Miami, Florida.

The movement gained national prominence when President Woodrow Wilson signed the Federal Aid Road Act of 1916 on July 11, 1916. In that year, the Buffalo Steam Roller Company of Buffalo, New York, and the Kelly-Springfield Company of Springfield, Ohio, merged to form the Buffalo-Springfield Company, which became the leader in the American compaction industry. Buffalo-Springfield enabled America to embark on a truly national highway construction campaign that continued into the 1920s.

Horatio Earle is known as the "Father of Good Roads". Quoting from Earle's 1929 autobiography: "I often hear now-a-days, the automobile instigated good roads; that the automobile is the parent of good roads. Well, the truth is, the bicycle is the father of the good roads movement in this country." "The League fought for the privilege of building bicycle paths along the side of public highways." "The League fought for equal privileges with horse-drawn vehicles. All these battles were won and the bicyclist was accorded equal rights with other users of highways and streets."

State Good Roads associations
The 1920 Directory of American Agricultural Organizations  lists the following state organizations as being affiliated with the Good Roads Movement:
 Alabama Good Roads Association
 Arizona Good Roads Association
 Central Florida Highway Association
 Good Roads Association of Wisconsin
 Illinois Association for Highway Improvement
 Kansas Good Roads Association
 Massachusetts Highway Association
 Michigan Pikes Association
 Michigan State Good Roads Association
 Montana Good Roads Congress
 Montana Highway Improvement Association
 Nebraska Good Roads Association
 Nevada Highway Association
 New Hampshire Good Roads Association
 New York Road Association
 North Carolina Good Roads Association
 Ohio Good Roads Federation
 Southeastern Idaho Good Roads Association
 Virginia Good Roads Association
 Washington State Good Roads Association
 Wilmington-Charlotte-Asheville Highway Association
 Wisconsin Highway Commissioners' Association
 Wyoming Good Roads Association

See also

 U.S. Highway association
 Keystone Markers
 Seedling miles and the later "ideal section" of the Lincoln Highway
 Roads Improvement Association

References

Further reading

Scholarly studies
 Finkelstein, Alexander. "Colorado Honor Convicts: Roads, Reform, and Region in the Progressive Era." Journal of the Gilded Age and Progressive Era 20.1 (2021): 24-43.

 Fuller, Wayne E. "Good roads and rural free delivery of mail." Mississippi Valley Historical Review 42.1 (1955): 67-83 online.

 Hugill, Peter J. "Good roads and the automobile in the United States 1880-1929." Geographical Review (1982): 327-349 online.

 Ingram, Tammy. Dixie Highway: Road Building and the Making of the Modern South, 1900-1930 (2013). It linked Chicago to Florida and helped modernize the South.

 Lee, Jason. "An Economic Analysis of the Good Roads Movement" (Institute of Transportation Studies, U of California, Davis; 2012) online
 Lichtenstein, Alex. "Good roads and chain gangs in the progressive South: ‘the negro convict is a slave.’ " Journal of Southern History (1993).  59#1: 85-110. online

 Longhurst, James. Bike battles: A history of sharing the American road (U of Washington Press, 2015).

 Olliff, Martin T. Getting Out of the Mud: The Alabama Good Roads Movement and Highway Administration, 1898–1928 (U of Alabama Press, 2017). online review

Advocacy in Good Roads magazine c. 1890–1920

Advocacy in popular national periodicals c. 1880–1920 (examples)

Advocacy in books and pamphlets c. 1880–1920 (examples)

External links

The Great Bicycle Protest of 1896
 Oklahoma Historical Society - Good Roads Association

History of cycling in the United States
Politics and technology
Cycling organizations in the United States
Political advocacy groups in the United States
Roads in the United States
1880 establishments in Rhode Island